Arthur Brown may refer to:

Entertainment
 Arthur William Brown (1881–1966), Canadian commercial artist
 H. Arthur Brown (1906–1992), American orchestral conductor
 Arthur Brown (musician) (born 1942), English rock singer
 Arthur Brown, aka Cluemaster, comic-book supervillain

Football
 Arthur Brown (footballer, born 1858) (1858–1909), English international football for Aston Villa, 1870s–1880s
 Albert Brown (footballer, born 1862) (1862–1930), English footballer for Aston Villa, 1880s–1890s – brother of the above and sometimes misidentified as Arthur
 Arthur Brown (footballer, born 1885) (1885–1944), English international footballer for Sheffield United and Sunderland
 Arthur Brown (footballer, born 1888) (1888–?), English football goalkeeper for Portsmouth and Southampton
 Arthur Brown (footballer, born 1903) (1903–1971), Welsh international goalkeeper for Aberdare, Reading, and Crewe Alexandra
 Arthur Brown (New Zealand footballer), New Zealand international footballer
 Arthur M. Brown (1884–1980), American college football coach
 Arthur Brown (American football) (born 1990), American football player
 Arthur Brown (rugby union) (born 1949), Scotland international rugby union player

Military
 Arthur Tillotson Brown (1878–1942), last captain of the first RMS Mauretania
 Arthur Whitten Brown (1886–1948), Scottish aviator
 Roy Brown (RAF officer) (Arthur Roy Brown, 1893–1944), Canadian WWI fighter ace
 Arthur E. Brown Jr. (born 1929), U.S. Army general

Politics
 Arthur Brown (U.S. senator) (1843–1906), American senator from Utah
 Arthur Winton Brown (1856–1916), New Zealand politician
 Arthur Bruce Brown (1911–1975), Canadian politician in British Columbia

Other
 Arthur Brown (engineer) (1851–1935), City Engineer, Nottingham
 Arthur Lewis Brown (1854–1928), American federal judge
 Arthur Judson Brown (1856–1963), American minister and missionary
 Arthur Brown Jr. (1874–1957), American architect
 Arthur T. Brown (1900–1993), American architect
 Arthur Stanley Brown (1912–2002), Australian suspect in a 1970 rape and murder case
 Arthur Graham Brown (1919–1982), Australian amateur ornithologist
 Arthur Brown (bishop) (1926–2011), Canadian suffragan bishop
 Arthur Brown (economist) (1914–2003), English economist
 Arthur Brown, an alias of Nicholas Alahverdian, American convicted sex offender who faked his death
 Arthur "Squirt" Brown Jr. (1970–2023), American murderer and perpetrator of the Brownstone Lane murders

See also 
 Arthur Browne (disambiguation)
 List of people with surname Brown